Searching-4 Taberno is a 2020 Argentine-American documentary film directed by Eduardo Montes-Bradley and produced through his film production and distribution studio Heritage Film Project.

The film traces the origins of German cinematographer Peter Paul Weinschenk before his arrival in Buenos Aires where he changed his name to Pablo Tabernero and became one of Argentina’s most influential cinematographers.

Searching-4 Taberno premiered on November 26, 2020.

Synopsis
For the film Montes-Bradley joins Tabernero's eldest son (Henry Weinschenk) and together trace Weinschenk's steps from his birth in Zehlendorf to his arrival in Buenos Aires. The documentary includes previously unseen color footage of La Boca filmed in 1941 and footage of Tabernero walking with the troops of Buenaventura Durruti as they move forward to attack the troops loyal to Francisco Franco.

Development 
Searching-4 Tabernero was filmed in Berlin, Trouville-sur-Mer, Barcelona, Madrid, New York, Charlottesville, Buenos Aires, and Mendoza.

Reception 
La Nación and Caligari both reviewed the movie favorably, the former calling it a tribute to Weinschenk. Ámbito also gave Searching-4 Tabernero a favorable review, stating that the movie left them wanting to know more.

References

External links 
 
Interview with Cinestel, Barcelona, Spain. 
Interview with Clarín
 Interview with GPS Audiovisual
 Interview with Pagina 12
 Interview with Radio Jai

2020 films
2020 independent films
Spanish Civil War films
Argentine documentary films
Argentine independent films
American documentary films
American independent films
2020s Spanish-language films
2020s German-language films
2020s English-language films
2020 documentary films
Films directed by Eduardo Montes-Bradley
2020s Argentine films
2020s American films